The Stanford School of Earth, Energy & Environmental Sciences, which changed its name from  the School of Earth Sciences in February 2015, is one of three schools at Stanford awarding both graduate and undergraduate degrees. Stanford's first faculty member was a professor of geology; as such it is considered the oldest academic foundation of Stanford University. It is composed of four departments and two interdisciplinary programs. Research and teaching span a wide range of disciplines. On May 4, 2022, Stanford announced that the School of Earth would stop operating on September 1, 2022, upon which it would become part of the newly established School of Sustainability.

History 
Earth Sciences at Stanford can trace its roots to the university's beginnings, when Stanford's first president, David Starr Jordan, hired John Casper Branner, a geologist, as the university's first professor. The search for and extraction of natural resources was the focus of Branner's geology department during that period of Western development.  Departments were originally not organized into schools but this changed when the department of geology became part of the School of Physical Sciences in 1926.  This changed in 1946 when the School of Mineral Sciences was established and geology eventually split into several departments.

Academics
There are four academic departments within the school; Earth System Science, Geological Sciences, Geophysics, and Energy Resources Engineering There are two interdisciplinary programs housed within the school: the undergraduate and coterminal master's program Earth Systems, and the graduate Emmett Interdisciplinary Program in Environment and Resources. In addition, the school organizes a master's degree in Computational Geoscience in collaboration with the Stanford Institute for Computational and Mathematical Engineering.  As of February 2015 it had 63 regular faculty members.

The interdisciplinary programs, in conjunction with the four departments, reach out to all other schools on the Stanford campus, the United States Geological Survey (USGS), and both state and federal policy makers.

The school's library, Branner Earth Sciences Library, contains over 125,000 volumes, a large map collection and Stanford's GIS lab for ongoing GIS reference and research consultation.

Rankings
The school as a whole was ranked as the third best Earth Sciences program by the U.S. News & World Report . (Caltech is ranked no. 1, MIT no. 2, and Berkeley is tied for no. 3).

Programs
The school offers both undergrad and graduate degrees. The majority of the students are graduate students, with a large contingent of coterminal master's degree recipients from the Earth Systems interdisciplinary program. The school attracts students from all six of the inhabited continents, and continues to be one of the most ethnically diverse Earth Sciences programs in the US.  About 4.0%  of Stanford's graduate students (approximately 360) are in the school and 1.4% of the undergraduates (approximately 100).

Research
Research programs in the SES continue to make groundbreaking discoveries about the planet, its environment, and human interactions. As a result, there are a number of industry funded-research groups (i.e.Stanford Exploration Project, Stanford Wave Physics Laboratory, Stanford Rock Physics and Borehole Geophysics Project) that implement student-led research for industry implementation.

San Andreas Fault Observatory at Depth (SAFOD)
The San Andreas Fault Observatory at Depth (SAFOD) is one of three components of the Earthscope Project, funded by the National Science Foundation in conjunction with the USGS and NASA. The SAFOD site is located just north of the town of Parkfield, California. The SAFOD main hole was drilled to a depth of ~3.4 km in 2004 and 2005, crossing the San Andreas near a region of the fault where repeating Magnitude 2 earthquakes are generated.

A goal of this project is to install instruments to record data near the source of these earthquakes. In addition to the installation of these instruments, rock and fluid samples were continuously collected during the drilling process, and will also be used to analyze changes in geochemistry and mechanical properties around the fault zone. The project will lead to a better understanding of the processes that control the behavior of the San Andreas fault, and it is hoped that the development of instrumentation and analytic methods will help evaluate the possibility of earthquake prediction which is of primary importance for earthquake engineering.

The project is co-PIed by Bill Ellsworth and Steve Hickman of the USGS, and Stanford geophysics faculty member and alum Mark Zoback. Zoback's research in the SES focuses on stress and crustal mechanics. His students are heavily engaged in on-going research in the Global Climate and Energy Project.

References

Earth, Energy and Environmental Sciences